is a railway station on the Yokkaichi Asunarou Railway Utsube Line and the Yokkaichi Asunarou Railway Hachiōji Line in Yokkaichi, Mie Prefecture, Japan, operated by the private railway operator Yokkaichi Asunarou Railway. It is 1.9 rail kilometers from the terminus of the Utsube Line at Asunarou Yokkaichi Station and is a terminal station for the Hachiōji Line.

Lines
Yokkaichi Asunarou Railway
Utsube Line
Hachiōji Line

Layout
Hinaga Station has a single side platform  and a triangular island platform serving three tracks. The station is unattended.

Platforms

Adjacent stations

Surrounding area
 Tempaku River

History
Hinaga Station was opened on August 14, 1912 as a station on the Mie Tramway Line, which became the Mie Railway in 1916. On February 11, 1944, due to mergers, the station came under the ownership of Sanco. On February 1, 1964 the Railway division of Sanco split off and formed a separate company, the Mie Electric Railway, which merged with Kintetsu on April 1, 1965.

The Utsube Line and the Hachiōji Line have been operated by the Yokkaichi Asunarou Railway since April 1, 2015.

References

External links

Railway stations in Japan opened in 1912
Railway stations in Mie Prefecture